Karachi Zebras was a Pakistani domestic first-class, List A and T20 cricket team, based in Karachi, Sindh. The team was established in 2006 and its home ground was National Stadium, Karachi.

Most matches as captain

See also
 Pakistan Super League
 Larkana Bulls

External links
Twenty20 Record page for Karachi Zebras
CricketArchive page for Karachi Zebras

Cricket clubs established in 2005
2005 establishments in Pakistan
Cricket teams in Pakistan
Zebras